Medicover Hospitals is a multinational hospitals chain in Europe and India. It is a part of European healthcare groups having its presence in 12 countries across the world with 26 hospitals.

The Medicover group provides a broad spectrum of Health care services and has a network of hospitals, cancer institutes, specialty care facilities, Fertility Centers, and diagnostic labs.

History 
Medicover was established in 1995 and headquartered in Poland. Medicover Warsaw Hospital first opened in Poland in 2009.

Medicover invested into Sahrudaya Healthcare Private Ltd., the holding company of MaxCure. After acquiring the MaxCure Group, India, on 22 August 2017, the company changed its name to Medicover Hospitals.

It has 20 outlets in India, spread over three states i.e., Telangana, Andhra Pradesh, and Maharashtra.

Branches 

Call Center: 040 6833 4455

Medicover has also established focus specialty centers:

 Medicover Women and Child Hospitals.
 Medicover Cancer Institute.

Departments 
The following departments are served by Medicover Hospitals India:

 Cardiology
 Orthopedics
 Neurology
 Oncology
 Gynecology
 Obstetrics
 Pediatrics
 Neonatology
 Gastroenterology
 General Surgery
 Nephrology
 Internal Medicine
 Plastic Surgery
 Urology
 Physiotherapy
 Critical Care
 Anesthesia
 Emergency Medicine
 Kidney Transplantation
 Liver Transplantation
 Ear, nose, and throat (ENT)
 Dermatology, cosmetic & plastic surgery
 Pulmonology

Key specialties

Cardiology 
Doctors performed rare and critical cardiac procedure at Medicover hospitals in Hyderabad India on a 20-year-old in the year 2021.

Neurology 
Doctors at Medicover hospitals in Hyderabad India removed cricket ball sized tumor from the brain of 55 years old women in the year 2021.

Orthopedics 
Doctors at Medicover Hospitals performed a spine surgery for the 32-year old Faraz from Gujarat's Vadodara city in the year 2020.

Gastroenterologists

Dental

Awards and achievements

References

External links 
 Official Website
 Official Website: Fertility Centers in India

Hospitals in Hyderabad, India
Health care companies of Sweden
Health care companies of India
Health care companies of Germany